Givens is a surname.

Notable people 
 Adele Givens, American comedy actress
 Bob Givens (1918–2017), American animator, character designer, and layout artist
 Charles J. Givens (1941–1998), American "get-rich-quick" author
 David Givens, American football player
 Don Givens (born 1949), Irish football player and coach
 Edward Givens (1930–1967), American astronaut
 Ernest Givens, American football player
 Jack Givens (born 1956), American basketball player
 John Givens, American basketball player and coach
 Kevin Givens (born 1997), American football player
 Mychal Givens, American baseball player
 Omm'A Givens, American basketball player
 Philip Givens, Canadian politician and judge
 Reggie Givens, American football player
 Robin Givens, American actress
 Terryl Givens, American professor of literature and religion
 Wallace Givens (1910–1993), American mathematician

See also

 Given (disambiguation), includes list of people with surname "Given"